The Horde (Russian title: Орда Orda, working title: Святитель Алексий Svjatitelj Alexij) is a 2012 historical film directed by Andrei Proshkin and written by Yuri Arabov. The film is a highly fictionalised narrative of how Saint Alexius healed Taidula Khatun, the mother of the Golden Horde khan Jani Beg, from blindness.

The film was released as The Golden Empire in the UK.

Plot
Jani Beg (Innokenty Dakayarov) kills his brother Khan Tini Beg (Andrey Panin) and replaces him. Soon, his mother Taidula (Roza Hairullina) goes blind and Jani Beg is desperate to have her blindness cured. Meanwhile, Alexius, Metropolitan of Moscow (Maxim Sukhanov) has reached fame as a wondermaker and Jani Beg asks Ivan the Fair (Vitaly Khaev) hand Alexius to him as a healer. Alexius is reluctant but Ivan sees this as a rare opportunity to delay the inevitable Tatar attack on Moscow. Eventually, Alexius succumbs and, accompanied by Jani Beg's retainers Timer (Fedot Lvov) and Badakyul (Aleksey Yegorov), travels to Saray-Jük with his keleynik Fedka (Aleksandr Yatsenko). They fail to cure Taidula's blindness and Alexius is banished, while Fedka is taken as a slave for desecrating the threshold. After a period of suffering and subsequent sanctification of Alexius, Taidula's eyes are healed. Alexius and Fedka return to Moscow. Shortly after, Jani Beg is assassinated by his son Berdi Beg (Moge Oorzhak).

Language
Most of the dialogues in The Horde are in the Karachay-Balkar language (with Russian overdub in the theatrical release). Filmmakers considered Karachay-Balkar as the living language most closely resembling Kipchak spoken by the 14th century Golden Horde. Nevertheless, none of the actors of Turkic extraction are native speakers of the language; Dakayarov, Lovov, and Yegorov are Yakuts, whereas Hairullina is Volga Tatar.

Accolades
 34th Moscow International Film Festival:
 “Silver George” for the best director: Andrey Proshkin
 “Silver George” for the best actress: Roza Hairullina
 Jury NETPAC Prize: ″Admirable combination of perfect cinematic images together with a strong idea of mercy in the times of severe oppression″.

References

  Moscow International Film Festival

External links
 

2012 films
Russian historical drama films
Karachay-Balkar-language films
2010s Russian-language films
Films set in the 14th century
Films set in Kazakhstan
Films set in Russia
Films about Christianity
Films about Orthodoxy